Katey Stone (born April 17, 1966) is one of the most successful coaches in the history of Division I women's ice hockey. Stone has accumulated  494 victories and has coached 25 seasons as a head coach with the Harvard Crimson. Stone was the third coach in women's college hockey history to win 300 games.

Early life
Stone attended the Taft School, Watertown, Connecticut and graduated class of 1984. Stone was a captain and four-year letter winner in hockey for the New Hampshire Wildcats women's ice hockey program. Stone was part of two ECAC championships in 1986 and 1987. In addition to ice hockey, Stone was an accomplished lacrosse player at New Hampshire and was part of the team that won the 1985 NCAA title. She graduated in 1989 with a degree in physical education. Before Harvard, Stone coached at Tabor Academy, Northfield Mount Hermon School and Phillips Exeter Academy.

Harvard Crimson
During her tenure, Stone has accumulated a record of  494-253-54 through the end of the 2019-2020 season. Before the 1994-95 season, Stone replaced John Dooley as the Crimson head coach. In her first year, Stone put together a record of 12-11-2. Over the next three seasons, the Crimson would be below .500. In 1998-99, the Crimson would go from 14-16-0 to 33-1-0. Under Stone, the club won the national championship in 1998-99. During her 11th season at Harvard (2004–05), Stone coached the Crimson to a second consecutive ECAC title. In the 2004 part of the campaign, the Crimson had a 7-6-1 start. After January 1, Stone led the team to an 18-0-2 finish. The Crimson qualified for their third straight Frozen Four appearance despite losing graduating Patty Kazmaier Award winners from the past two seasons.

In 2013-2014, Stone stepped away from the bench at Harvard to be head coach for the US Olympic women's ice hockey team. She was the first woman to be named head coach for any US Hockey team at the Olympics.  The US squad took home the silver medal at the Sochi Olympics, losing in the championship game to Team Canada.

With Stone back behind the bench, the 2014-2015 Crimson women's ice hockey team had a highly successful season, winning the Beanpot, the Ivy League championship, and finishing atop the standings in the ECAC at the close of the season. They went on to win the ECAC tournament, and advanced to the NCAA Frozen Four where they lost to the Minnesota Golden Gophers in the Championship game, and finished as national runners-up.

On February 26, 2010, the Crimson defeated the Princeton Tigers women's ice hockey program by a 5-1 score. With the win, Katey Stone became women's college hockey's all-time winningest coach, surpassing former Minnesota Golden Gophers women's ice hockey head coach Laura Halldorson.   At the end of the 2019-2020, she was ranked fourth in number of wins for college women's hockey coaches.

Stone is a member of the NCAA Championship committee and was a former president of the American Women's Hockey Coaches Association.

Players
Stone has coached nine players that have competed in ice hockey at the Winter Olympic Games. In addition, six of the first 12 winners of the Patty Kazmaier Memorial Award (Jennifer Botterill twice, Julie Chu, A.J. Mleczko, Angela Ruggiero, Sarah Vaillancourt) were players under Stone's tutelage. Players for the Crimson have earned All-America honors a total of 21 times since the 1998-99 season. These All-Americans include the first players be four-time first-team All-Americans: Jennifer Botterill and Angela Ruggiero. Stone has also coached eight ECAC Players of the Year, nine Ivy League Players of the Year, four ECAC Rookies of the Year, and five Ivy League Rookies of the Year.

Postseason
1999 AWCHA national championship
Three consecutive appearances in the NCAA championship game (2003, 2004, 2005)
 Eight NCAA tournament appearances

Titles
(Until end of 2010 season)
Six ECAC regular-season titles
Five ECAC tournament championships
Five Ivy League titles 
10 Beanpot championships

International
Stone coached the 1996 U.S. National Team. Ten years later, she was the head coach of the U.S. Women's Under-22 Team. She was the head coach of the gold-medal winning U.S. Women's Under-18 National Team at the World Championships in January 2008. In November 2008, Stone led the US National Team to the gold medal at the Four Nations Cup.   Stone led Team USA's National Team to a gold medal in the 2013 World Championships  and was the head coach of Team USA in Sochi, Russia for the 2014 Olympic Games. Team USA earned the silver medal, falling to Team Canada in the gold medal game.  Team USA held a 2-0 lead late in the game, before surrendering 2 goals in the final 4 minutes of regulation time.  Team Canada scored the gold medal winning goal in the 9th minute of overtime.

Awards and honors
1999 AHCA Coach of the Year
2004-05 USCHO.com Coach of the Year
 2014 NCAA Silver Anniversary Award

See also
List of college women's ice hockey coaches with 250 wins

References

1966 births
Taft School alumni
Living people
Harvard Crimson women's ice hockey coaches
New Hampshire Wildcats women's ice hockey players
New Hampshire Wildcats women's lacrosse players
People from Litchfield County, Connecticut
American ice hockey coaches